Marque is an Austrian pop artist. He has released albums on the Polydor (1995–1997) and Edel Music (2000) labels.  In 2000 he had two top-five singles in the Austrian charts.

Discography

1995 "Wanna Make Love To You"
Singles:
"Something In My Eyes"

1997 "Fonkononia"
Singles:
"She Walks"
"Charlies Letter"
"Show You How To Dream"

2000 "Freedomland"
Singles:
"One To Make Her Happy" 2000 
"Electronic Lady" 2000
"River" 2000
"Rose without a thorn" 2001

2003 "Pirate Of My Soul"
Singles:
"Wonderman" 2002 music video directed by Tim Claxton
"Two More Lonely People" 2002
"The Reason Why" 2003
"Superstar" 2004
"Sorry But I Wonder" 2004

2004 "Transparent"
Singles:
"Rose Without A Thorn"
Transparent is an album containing some tracks from Pirate Of My Soul and few b-sides formerly available only online.
It also features the single Rose Without A Thorn which wasn't released on any album before.

References

Austrian male musicians
Living people
Year of birth missing (living people)
Place of birth missing (living people)